The VII International Gold Cup was a motor race, run to Formula One rules, held on 24 September 1960 at Oulton Park, Cheshire. The race was run over 60 laps of the circuit, and was won by British driver Stirling Moss in a Lotus 18.

The Scuderia Eugenio Castellotti team did not arrive after their transporter was involved in an accident and the cars were damaged. During the race, Ian Burgess was black-flagged due to his car grounding excessively.

This was the last European Formula One race run to the 2.5 litre Formula, with the new 1.5 litre Formula being introduced for 1961.

Results

References

 Results at Silhouet.com 

International Gold Cup
International Gold Cup
Gold